Gymnophryxe is a genus of flies in the family Tachinidae.

Species
Gymnophryxe carthaginiensis (Bischof, 1900)
Gymnophryxe claripennis (Reinhard, 1943)
Gymnophryxe inconspicua (Villeneuve, 1924)
Gymnophryxe modesta Herting, 1973
Gymnophryxe nudigena (Villeneuve, 1922)
Gymnophryxe theodori (Kugler, 1968)

References

Diptera of Europe
Diptera of Asia
Diptera of North America
Exoristinae
Tachinidae genera
Taxa named by Joseph Villeneuve de Janti